Yuri Semyonovich Gusev (born September 25, 1921 – ?) is a Soviet chess player and was a Merited Master of Sport of the USSR (1951). He is also a former radio engineer. Gusev peaked with a classical Elo rating of 2380, making him the equivalent of a FIDE Master in terms of strength, although it is not clear what title he ultimately achieved. As of December 2022, it is unknown if he is still alive.

Gusev was a participant in many championships in Moscow, including semi-finals of the championship of the USSR (best results: XIX: 4–6, XXII: 6–7). In 1948, he drew a match with Ilya Kan.

A game in 1946, known as Gusev's Immortal, included a positional queen sacrifice against E Auerbach at Molniya Sporting Society, and it was featured as Game of the Day on chessgames.com on October 11, 2011. The game itself was not part of a major competition, but Gusev's Immortal has been brought from obscurity in the 21st century and has been widely recognized for its long-term strategic brilliance. The queen sacrifice itself is not noticed as a good idea by most of the strongest engines unless run to extreme depths, with one user in the comments section of a 2012 YouTube video in 2020 stating it took Stockfish 11 (the strongest engine at the time) six hours and 48 minutes at Depth 73/49 to recommend the queen sacrifice and see that it was winning by +4.07. On the other hand, in a different video, from 2020, the chess YouTuber Suren Chess discovered that it took Leela Chess Zero (a chess engine that uses neural networks for greater positional understanding) just eight seconds on his setup, while Stockfish was unable to find the sacrifice despite calculating more than 600 million nodes using powerful cloud analysis. It wasn't until the release of Stockfish 15 in 2022 that it immediately suggested the queen sacrifice, 76 years after the original game; however, Stockfish 15.1 inexplicably ceases to find the move to at least depth 86 after searching more than 47.4 billion nodes. Conversely, Stockfish 15 NNUE finds the move after just a few seconds.

While Gusev's queen sacrifice was indeed proved to be the best move by comprehensive human and computer analysis, there was speculation that a defensive resource near the end of the game Gusev played where his opponent could have formed a fortress to draw the game, but such a defence (in addition to an alternative line that would have cemented the win) was only found in 2011, 65 years later after the original game, thanks to an investigation by the user Vass on chesspub.com. Had Gusev and Auerbach played the objectively best moves at every point after his brilliancy, the game would still be a victory for White. 

Grandmaster Simon Williams called Gusev's Immortal one of the most beautiful ideas that he had ever seen.

Gusev appeared to play his last recorded game in 1999 at 77 years old at the Efim Geller Memorial.

References 

Soviet chess players
20th-century chess players